Mehdi Kadi (born 21 September 1994) is a French footballer who plays as a forward for AS Cannes.

Career statistics

References

Living people
1994 births
Association football forwards
French footballers
Ligue 2 players
Championnat National players
Championnat National 2 players
Championnat National 3 players
Football Bourg-en-Bresse Péronnas 01 players
Jura Sud Foot players
FC Annecy players
AS Cannes players